Phalcoboenus is a small genus of caracara in the family Falconidae. They are found in barren, open habitats in the Andes, Patagonia and the Falkland Islands. The four species are almost entirely allopatric. The adults are distinctive, with bare yellow, orange or red facial skin and cere, and a black plumage with variable amounts of white. Juveniles are overall brown with pale pinkish-grey facial skin and cere. They are highly opportunistic and typically seen walking on the ground, where they will feed on carrion and virtually any small animal they can catch.

Species
There are four extant and one extinct species.

The extant species are:

The extinct species is Phalcoboenus napieri which is known from subfossil remains unearthed in peat deposits from the Falkland Islands, described in 2016 and named for Roddy Napier, the owner of West Point Island in the Falklands.

References

 Jaramillo, Alvaro, Burke, Peter, & Beadle, David (2003). Birds of Chile. Christopher Helm, London. .

 
Birds of prey